Hurrah! I Live! is a 1928 German silent comedy film directed by Wilhelm Thiele and starring Nicolas Koline, Max Gülstorff, and Alexej Bondireff. It was adapted from the play Der mutige Seefahrer by Georg Kaiser.

The film's sets were designed by the art directors Max Knaake and Vladimir Meingard

Cast

References

Bibliography

External links

1928 films
Films of the Weimar Republic
German silent feature films
Films based on works by Georg Kaiser
Films directed by Wilhelm Thiele
German black-and-white films
UFA GmbH films
1928 comedy films
German comedy films
Silent comedy films
1920s German films
1920s German-language films